The Wells Fargo Center (90 South 7th St), formerly known as Norwest Center, is the third-tallest building in Minneapolis, Minnesota, after the IDS Center and the Capella Tower. Completed in 1988, it is 774 feet (235.6 m) tall.  For many years, this was believed to be one foot shorter than Capella, but that structure actually had a different height (see the Capella Tower article for details). Norwest Center was designed with a modernized art deco style by César Pelli, reflecting nearby structures such as the nearby CenturyLink Building and the Foshay Tower, which is several blocks away. It is also considered by many to be a homage to 30 Rockefeller Plaza in New York City.

Wells Fargo Center sits on the site of the old Northwestern National Bank Building, which was destroyed in a fire in 1982. The original design called for a 45-story tower with a square footprint that would have been crowned the tallest building in Minneapolis; however, the site was halved in size, requiring the building's design to be changed to what it is today. Northwestern National, renamed Norwest Corporation, maintained its headquarters here. Despite Norwest's adoption of the Wells Fargo identity after acquiring the latter and moving to San Francisco in 1998, significant regional operations are still maintained in this building. Other major tenants include the law firm of Faegre Drinker and the local office of accounting firm KPMG.

It is brilliantly lit at night from sunset through midnight, with floodlamps pointing up from the setback rooftops to illuminate the sides of the building. Despite this, it is still much more energy efficient than the previous building and in 2000, it was recognized by the United States Environmental Protection Agency as one of the 100 most energy efficient buildings in the USA. In 1989, the building was praised by the Urban Land Institute, who honored it with their Award for Excellence in Large Scale Office Development. It is located at 90 South 7th Street. Gaviidae Common, a neighboring shopping center, was also designed by Pelli and built at the same time.

A branch of the Wells Fargo History Museum was located in the skyway level. The museum's exhibits included an 1863 stagecoach, telegraph equipment, gold nuggets and coins. It closed in September 2020.

As of April 2019, Starwood Capital Group acquired Wells Fargo Center for $314 million.  The sellers were Hines and Blackstone.

Broadcasting

FM

See also 
List of tallest buildings in Minnesota

References

External links 

Wells Fargo Center
Emporis: Wells Fargo Center
Glass and Steel and Stone: Architecture of the Wells Fargo Center

Skyscraper office buildings in Minneapolis
Art Deco architecture in Minnesota
César Pelli buildings
Wells Fargo buildings
Office buildings completed in 1988
1988 establishments in Minnesota